Lombardi may refer to:

 Lombardi (surname)
 Lombardi (play), a Broadway play
 Lombardi (film), a 2010 television documentary
 I lombardi alla Prima Crociata, an opera by Verdi
 Lombardi Software was an enterprise software company based in Austin, Texas
 Lombardi's, first pizzeria in the United States
 Lombardy, a region of Italy
 Georgetown Lombardi Comprehensive Cancer Center, a cancer center in Washington, D.C.
 Falco Lombardi, a fictional character
 Vince Lombardi Trophy: awarded to the winning team of the Super Bowl

See also
Lombardo
Lombards
Longobardi (disambiguation)
Lombard (disambiguation)